Theodorus "Theo" Adrianus de Lange (born 16 March 1960 in Kralingen, Rotterdam) is a sailor from the Netherlands, who represented his country at the 2018 Vintage Yachting Games in Hellerup Denmark. De Lange as middleman together with helmsman Rudy den Outer and Gabor Helmhout on the foredeck took the Gold medal in the Soling. During the 2019 North American Championship in Kingston, Ontario, De Lange again as middleman in the Dutch Soling Sophie’s Choice together with helmsman Rudy den Outer but now with Thies Bosch on the foredeck took first place. This was the first time European sailors won this championship in the over fifty years history of the North American Soling Championship!

With Rudy den Outer and Ramzi Souli Theo became European Champion in the Soling at Mandello del Lario, Italy in 2021,

De Lange became in 2000, together with Rudy den Outer and Leo Determan, the last Dutch Champions during the Olympic Soling era.  Theo is since 2018 also one of the elected International Soling Association committee members.

Personal life 
De Lange lives and works near Capelle aan den IJssel, earned a degree in law at the Erasmus University Rotterdam, is married and has two daughters.

References

1960 births
Living people
Dutch male sailors (sport)
Finn class sailors
North American Champions Soling
European Champions Soling
Sportspeople from Rotterdam